Umesh Malik is an Indian politician. He belongs to the Bharatiya Janata Party. He was a member of the Seventeenth Legislative Assembly of Uttar Pradesh representing the Budhana assembly constituency. As of 2022, he is 56 years old and a graduate.

Political career
Umesh Malik has been a member of the 17th Legislative Assembly of Uttar Pradesh. He had represented the Budhana constituency and is a member of the Bhartiya Janata Party. He defeated Samajwadi Party candidate Pramod Tyagi by a margin of 13,201 votes.

Posts held

References 

Uttar Pradesh MLAs 2017–2022
Bharatiya Janata Party politicians from Uttar Pradesh
Living people
Year of birth missing (living people)